Kelvington-Wadena is a provincial electoral district for the Legislative Assembly of Saskatchewan, Canada, in the east-central region. It was created in 1975 from Wadena and Kelvington.

The riding was last contested in the 2020 general election, when it returned Saskatchewan Party MLA Hugh Nerlien.

The largest population centres in the constituency are Wynyard, Wadena, Foam Lake, Kelvington and Porcupine Plain. Villages in the riding include Bjorkdale, Elfros, Rama, Archerwill, Margo and Lintlaw. Both major Canadian railways – the Canadian National and the Canadian Pacific – have branch lines serving the area.

History 
Since it was first contested in 1975, the riding has returned MLAs from all three major parties. It originally alternated between the New Democrats and Progressive Conservatives, before being won by Liberal MLA June Draude with a thin plurality. Draude later joined the newly created Saskatchewan Party, and the riding has been held by Saskatchewan Party MLAs since.

Members of the Legislative Assembly

This riding has elected the following Members of the Legislative Assembly:

Election results

2020 Saskatchewan general election

2016 Saskatchewan general election

2011 Saskatchewan general election

2007 Saskatchewan general election

2003 Saskatchewan general election

1999 Saskatchewan general election

1995 Saskatchewan general election

1991 Saskatchewan general election

1986 Saskatchewan general election

1982 Saskatchewan general election

1978 Saskatchewan general election

1975 Saskatchewan general election

References

External links 
Website of the Legislative Assembly of Saskatchewan
Saskatchewan Archives Board – Saskatchewan Election Results By Electoral Division

Rama, Saskatchewan
Saskatchewan provincial electoral districts